Rio Grande is a historic passenger station located in Lower Township, Cape May County, New Jersey, United States. The station was built in 1894 by the Atlantic City Railroad. Subsequently, the station served passengers on the Pennsylvania-Reading Seashore Lines.

The station was donated to Historic Cold Spring Village, a history museum in Lower Township, and it was moved to the museum site in 1975. It now operates as a seasonal heritage railroad station for the Cape May Seashore Lines. The station was added to the National Register of Historic Places on February 13, 2007, for its significance in architecture. In the summer of 2013, the Cape May Seashore Lines operated Gas-powered speeder cars from Cold Spring Station to approximately one mile south on the line for the public. Since scrap vandals ravaged tracks from Woodbine to Dennisville in the summer of 2012, no locomotives or railcars have been able to operate to Cold Spring station or points farther south since 2011.

See also
Operating Passenger Railroad Stations Thematic Resource (New Jersey)
National Register of Historic Places listings in Cape May County, New Jersey

References

Lower Township, New Jersey
Railway stations in the United States opened in 1894
Railway stations in Cape May County, New Jersey
Former railway stations in New Jersey
Queen Anne architecture in New Jersey
Railway stations on the National Register of Historic Places in New Jersey
Former Pennsylvania-Reading Seashore Lines stations
National Register of Historic Places in Cape May County, New Jersey
New Jersey Register of Historic Places